Scrobigera is a genus of moths of the family Noctuidae. The genus was erected by Karl Jordan in 1896.

Species
 Scrobigera albomarginata Moore, 1872
 Scrobigera amatrix Westwood, 1848
 Scrobigera claggi Clench, 1953
 Scrobigera hesperioides Walker, 1862
 Scrobigera niveifasciata Rothschild, 1896
 Scrobigera proxima Walker, 1854
 Scrobigera semperi Felder, 1874
 Scrobigera taeniata Rothschild & Jordan, 1903
 Scrobigera umbrosa Clench, 1953
 Scrobigera vacillans Walker, [1865]
 Scrobigera vulcania Butler, 1875

References

Agaristinae